Jöns is a Swedish given name and a surname.

Notable people with the given name include:

 Jöns Jacob Berzelius (1779–1848), Swedish chemist
 Jöns Budde (1435–1495), Franciscan friar from the Brigittine monastery in NaantaliVallis Gratiae - near Turku, Finland
 Jöns Gerekesson (died 1433), controversial Archbishop of Uppsala, Sweden 1408–1421, and Iceland 1426–1433 until he was drowned
 Jöns Peter Hemberg (1763–1834), Swedish banker and member of parliament
 Jöns Bengtsson Oxenstierna (1417–1467), Swedish archbishop of Uppsala (1448–1467) and regent of Sweden
 Jöns Svanberg (1771–1851), Swedish clergyman and natural scientist

Notable people with the surname include:

 Karin Jöns (born 1953), German politician and Member of the European Parliament with the Social Democratic Party of Germany

See also 

 
 
 Jönssi
 Jönsson

Swedish masculine given names